Anjala was a town in Southern Finland.

Anjala may also refer to:

People
 Anjala Zaveri (born 1972), Indian British actress
 Ari Anjala, Finnish orienteering competitor
 Outi Borgenström-Anjala (born 1956), Finnish orienteering competitor
 Topi Anjala, Finnish orienteering competitor

Other uses
 Anjala conspiracy, a scheme to end the Russo-Swedish War of 1788–1790
 Anjala (film), a 2016 Indian film
 Anjala (Kouvola), a district in Kouvola, Finland
 Anjala (Salo, Finland), a district in Salo, Finland